Phytomyza minuscula is a species of leaf miner fly in the Phytomyza minuscula group, along with Phytomyza aquilegivora (the columbine leafminer).

References

minuscula
Leaf miners
Insects described in 1851